The public servant in charge of the Canadian Department of Justice holds the dual titles of Deputy Minister of Justice and Deputy Attorney General of Canada.  He or she provides advice and support to the Minister of Justice and Attorney General of Canada (an elected official) and acts as the main interface between the political and administrative functions of the Government of Canada.

List Deputy Ministers of Justice and Deputy Attorneys General of Canada

Lists of Canadian civil servants